Tanglang station is a Metro station of Shenzhen Metro Line 5. It opened on 22 June 2011. This station is an elevated station.

Tanglang is marked on the Shenzhen Metro map as the station for the South University of Science and Technology of China (formerly South University of Science and Technology of China in English).

Station layout

Exits

References

External links
 Shenzhen Metro Tanglang Station (Chinese)
 Shenzhen Metro Tanglang Station (English)

Shenzhen Metro stations
Railway stations in Guangdong
Nanshan District, Shenzhen
Railway stations in China opened in 2011
Railway stations at university and college campuses